The Layton Utah Temple is a temple of the Church of Jesus Christ of Latter-day Saints under construction in Layton, Utah. The intent to construct the temple was announced by church president Russell M. Nelson on April 1, 2018, during the 188th annual general conference. The Layton Utah Temple was announced concurrently with 6 other temples. At the time, the number of total operating or announced temples was 189. When completed, it will be the 19th temple in Utah and the second temple in Davis County.

On July 15, 2019, the church announced that the temple will be constructed on an 11.8-acre property located at the corner of Oak Hills Drive and Rosewood Lane on the southeast side of Layton and noted that the preliminary plans called for a three-story temple of more than 87,000 square feet.

On October 8, 2019, the church released a rendering of the Layton Utah Temple. 

On January 23, 2020, the church announced that a groundbreaking, to signify the beginning of construction, was scheduled to occur on May 30, 2020. However, due to the COVID-19 pandemic, a small-scale, private groundbreaking occurred on May 23, 2020, with Craig C. Christensen, president of the church's Utah Area, presiding. The church then provided photographs and video of the groundbreaking on the originally scheduled date.

See also

 The Church of Jesus Christ of Latter-day Saints in Utah
 Comparison of temples of The Church of Jesus Christ of Latter-day Saints
 List of temples of The Church of Jesus Christ of Latter-day Saints
 List of temples of The Church of Jesus Christ of Latter-day Saints by geographic region
 Temple architecture (Latter-day Saints)

References

External links
Layton Utah Temple at ChurchofJesusChristTemples.org

Temples (LDS Church) in Utah
Layton, Utah
Buildings and structures under construction in the United States